This is a list of the NCAA outdoor champions in the triple jump.  The event was only held in Olympic years until 1959.  Measurement of the jumps was conducted in imperial distances (feet and inches) until 1975.  Metrication occurred in 1976, so all subsequent championships were measured in metric distances.

Champions
Key
w=wind aided
A=Altitude assisted

References

GBR Athletics

External links
NCAA Division I men's outdoor track and field

Triple Jump NCAA Men's Division I Outdoor Track and Field Championships
Outdoor track, men
Triple jump